Bastar Dussehra is the unique cultural trait of Chhattisgarh. Celebrated by the local people of the state with sufficient vigor, the festival of Dussehra connotes to the supreme power of goddess Danteswari. During Dussehra, the inhabitants of Bastar organizes special worship ceremonies at the Danteswari temple of Jagadalpur. On this occasion rath is made in which goddess sits

History 
It is believed that Maharaja Purushaottam Deo first initiated the festival of Dussehra in the early hours of 15th century. Bastar to take part in this holy festival. During the entire ten days of the occasion, the respected Raj family of Bastar arrange worship sessions in which the ancient arms of the Goddess Danteswari are treated as divine elements. One of the inherent traits of Bastar Dussehra is that the control of the state is formally transferred to the Diwan keeping the Zamindar and similar important personalities as witnesses. Kunwar amavasya is the first day of dussera. On the night of the first day the customary transfer of control takes place. A mystique characteristics of this ceremony is that before handing over the power to the Diwan, a girl who is believed to have possessed the spiritual powers is asked for permission. This girl is seen with a wooden sword and stands in a war-like posture. The second day of dussehra is called pratipada which is followed by arti and salami. On the ninth day, the Raja of Bastar welcomes goddess Danteswari who comes to the entrance of the city in a doli or palanquin. The tenth day of the festival is called dussehra when the Raja organizes a darbar where people come and present their requests. Also aarti ceremony is held on the last day of dussehra . . The dussehra festival is a famous event of India, but the dussehra of Bastar is completely different from the commonly known festival of the country. Bastar Dussehra celebrate the divine bliss of Goddess Danteswari who is the revered deity of all the existing tribes of Chhattisgarh.

References

Bastar district
Festivals in Chhattisgarh